A heldentenor (English: heroic tenor), earlier called tenorbariton, is an operatic tenor voice, most often associated with Wagnerian repertoire.

It is distinct from other tenor fächer by its endurance, volume, and dark timbre, which may be, in its middle register, like that of a baritone. The voice may also sound clear or metallic. It is one of the rarest voice types in opera. Heldentenor roles, such as the title roles in Siegfried and Lohengrin, often require commanding stage presence and strong acting ability. In some cases, due to reasons such as voice misidentification, singers may begin their careers as baritones before later transitioning. The term heldentenor may be used to refer to both a singer and their voice.

The treble counterpart of the heldentenor is the Wagnerian soprano.

Roles
The following roles are in the standard heldentenor repertoire:

Richard Wagner 
 Lohengrin, Lohengrin
 Parsifal, Parsifal
 Rienzi, Rienzi
 Siegfried, Siegfried and Götterdämmerung
 Siegmund, Die Walküre
 Tannhäuser, Tannhäuser
 Tristan, Tristan und Isolde
 Walther von Stolzing, Die Meistersinger von Nürnberg

Richard Strauss 
 Aegisth, Elektra
 Apollo, Daphne
 Bacchus, Ariadne auf Naxos
 Guntram, Guntram
 Herodes, Salome
 Der Kaiser (The Emperor), Die Frau ohne Schatten
 Menelaus, Die ägyptische Helena

Other 
 Aeneas, Les Troyens (Berlioz)
 Florestan, Fidelio, (Beethoven)
 Otello, Otello (Verdi)
 Paul, Die tote Stadt (Korngold)
 Peter Grimes, Peter Grimes (Britten)
 Samson, Samson et Dalila (Saint-Saëns)
 Tambourmajor (Drum Major), Wozzeck (Berg)

Example singers

Germany 
 Ludwig Schnorr von Carolsfeld
 Peter Hofmann
 Siegfried Jerusalem
 Heinrich Knote
 René Kollo
 Max Lorenz
 Albert Niemann
Johannes Sembach
 Set Svanholm
 Georg Unger
 Wolfgang Windgassen

Northern, Central, and Western Europe 
 Karel Burian
 Lauritz Melchior
 Karl Aagaard Østvig
 Jean de Reszke
 Erik Schmedes
 Leo Slezak
 Josef Tichatschek
 Jacques Urlus
 Christopher Ventris
 Walter Widdop

North and South America 
 Richard Cassilly
 Ben Heppner
 James King
 Gary Lakes
 Robert Dean Smith
 Jon Vickers
 Ramon Vinay

References

 
Opera terminology
Richard Wagner
Voice types